Stommeln is a village (Stadtteil), part of the town of Pulheim, in North Rhine-Westphalia, Germany. It has a population of 8,462 (2021).

Geography 
Stommeln is situated to the north-west of Cologne. Its most recognisable feature is the old mill.

Belonging to Stommeln:
Stommelerbusch (882 residents)
Ingendorf (92 residents)

Culture and sights

Synagogue Project Stommeln 
The Synagogue in Stommeln was built in 1882. It resisted the Nazi pogroms. Since 1991 there is an annual exhibition of an international artist.

1991 Jannis Kounellis
1992 Richard Serra
1993 Georg Baselitz
1994 Mischa Kuball
1995 Eduardo Chillida
1996 Maria Nordman
1997 Carl Andre
1998 Rebecca Horn
1999 Erich Reusch
2000 Giuseppe Penone
2001 Roman Signer
2002 Lawrence Weiner
2003 Rosemarie Trockel
2004 Richard Long
2005 Sol LeWitt
2006 Santiago Sierra
2007 Max Neuhaus
2008 Maurizio Cattelan

Distinguished or important personage 

 Christina von Stommeln
 Dieter Dierks

References

External links 
 http://www.stommeln.de

Former municipalities in North Rhine-Westphalia
Rhein-Erft-Kreis